Royal Centre or Royal Center may refer to:

Royal Center, Indiana, United States
The Royal Center Tower, a viewing tower in the city of Niagara Falls in Canada
The Royal Centre for Defence Medicine, a medical facility in Birmingham in England
The Royal Centre (Halifax), an office tower in the city of Halifax in Canada
The Royal Centre (Vancouver), a retail and office complex in the city of Vancouver in Canada
The Royal Centre in the city of Nottingham in England, comprising:
The Theatre Royal, Nottingham
The Royal Concert Hall, Nottingham
The Royal Centre tram stop